Northland College is a small co-educational secondary school in Kaikohe.

History 
Utilising buildings built for a military hospital during the Second World War, the school was opened in 1947. Originally called the Northland Agricultural and Technical College, the school was established with a farm and forestry block to provide financial support into the future.

Over its first twenty years new buildings were gradually added, and by 1968 the school had moved out of the original hospital buildings which remained a hostel.

Houses 
Like many New Zealand schools, Northland College groups students into Houses for pastoral support and internal competitions. The names of the Houses have changed over the years.

First names: Clendon, Hobson, Maning, Marsden, Pompallier, Williams.

Second names: Pouerua, Putahi, Ramaroa, Whakatere

Third names: Rata, Tawa, Rimu, Kowhai

Current names: Kauri, Matai, Totara.

New school buildings 
In August 2015 the Ministry of Education approved a $14 million rebuild as the original school buildings had  deteriorated to a considerably dilapidated state. This followed considerable reporting in NZ print and television media. The newly constructed buildings were opened in July 2017.

Principals 
 Duane Allen

Notable alumni

 Suzy Cato – TV host and children's entertainer
 Sid Going – rugby union player
 Fiona Kidman (born 1940), novelist, poet, scriptwriter and short story author
 Jim Peters – school principal and politician
 Joe Williams – Cook Islands politician, doctor
 Kawhena Woodman – rugby union player
 Fred Woodman – rugby union player

References

External links 
School website

Educational institutions established in 1947
Far North District
Secondary schools in the Northland Region
1947 establishments in New Zealand
Kaikohe